Colour Cross, released in North America as Color Cross, is a puzzle video game for the Nintendo DS by French developer Little Worlds Studio. It is a derivative of picross, but requires the user to complete grids using multiple colours with no blank spaces.

The game contains 150 puzzles split between ten categories.  The player's time is recorded, with time penalties incurred for mistakes made.

Colour Cross received average reception, with a score of 72/100 on Metacritic.

References

External links
Official website for Europe
Metacritic data

2008 video games
Nintendo DS games
Nintendo DS-only games
Puzzle video games
Video games developed in France
Rising Star Games games
Single-player video games